The Maritime and Coastguard Agency (MCA) is an executive agency of the United Kingdom that responsible for implementing British and international maritime law and safety policy. It works to prevent the loss of lives at sea and to prevent marine pollution. It is a subsidiary executive agency of the UK Department for Transport and responsible through the Secretary of State for Transport to Parliament. It is also responsible for land based search and rescue helicopter operations since 2015. Its motto is "Safer Lives, Safer Ships, Cleaner Seas". The organisation is currently led by Damien Oliver.

Responsibilities
Its responsibilities include coordinating search and rescue (SAR) on the coastline and at sea through His Majesty's Coastguard (HMCG), ensuring that ships meet international and UK safety standards, monitoring and preventing coastal water pollution and testing and issuing Merchant Navy Certificates of Competency (licences) for ships' officers and crew to STCW requirements. The MCA is chiefly responsible for the syllabus and national training standards issued by the Merchant Navy Training Board (based at the UK Chamber of Shipping).

The MCA has three distinct "outward facing" elements - provision of search and rescue and prevention activity through His Majesty's Coastguard, port and flag state control of shipping through a network of Marine Offices and the development of international standards and policy for shipping through the International Maritime Organization. MCA utilizes airborne assets in the form of helicopters, fixed wing aircraft and drones for SAR, and other, operations and is going to make greater use of these technologies under the UKSAR2G contract to be awarded in 2024.

The MCA has now established an automatic identification system (AIS) network around the UK coast, for real-time tracking and monitoring of shipping movements from the shore.

History

The MCA was established on 1 April 1998 following a government merger of the UK Coastguard Agency and the UK Marine Safety Agency (MSA). 

The MCA was led by Vice Admiral Sir Alan Michael Massey between 2010 and 2018. Brian Johnson then served as Chief Executive of the MCA between 2018 and 2022.

See also
 Code of safe working practices
 Merchant navy
 Royal National Lifeboat Institution

References

External links

Water transport in the United Kingdom
Executive agencies of the United Kingdom government
Maritime transport authorities
Sea rescue organisations of the United Kingdom
Department for Transport
British Merchant Navy